More Than I Asked For: Celebrating Christmas with Joy Williams is the first holiday-themed release from musician Joy Williams. It was released on November 23, 2009.

Track listing
"More Than I Asked For"
"A Little Bit of Love"
"A Little Bit of Love (GarageBand)" (NoiseTrade Exclusive)
"Bring a Torch, Jeannette, Isabella" (NoiseTrade Exclusive)

References

2009 EPs
Joy Williams (singer) albums